Securities and Exchange Commission v. Chenery Corporation, 318 U.S. 80 (1943), is a United States Supreme Court case. It is often referred to as Chenery I, as four years later the case was before the Supreme Court a second time in Chenery II. Chenery I set out what is known as the Chenery Doctrine, a basic principle of U.S. administrative law that an agency may not defend an administrative decision on new grounds not set forth by the agency in its original decision.

Background 

The respondents, who were officers, directors, and controlling stockholders of the Federal Water Service Corporation (hereafter called Federal), a holding company registered under the Public Utility Holding Company Act of 1935, c. 687, 49 Stat. 803, 15 U.S.C. § 79 et seq., brought this proceeding under § 24(a) of the Act to review an order made by the Securities and Exchange Commission on September 24, 1941, approving a plan of reorganization for the company. Under the Commission's order, preferred stock acquired by the respondents during the period in which successive reorganization plans proposed by the management of the company were before the Commission was not permitted to participate in the reorganization on an equal footing with all other preferred stock. The United States Court of Appeals for the District of Columbia, with one judge dissenting, set the Commission's order aside, 75 U.S.App.D.C. 374, 128 F.2d 303, and, because the question presented loomed large in the administration of the Act, the Supreme Court granted certiorari.

See also 
 Administrative law
 Securities and Exchange Commission v. Chenery Corporation (1947)
Bowen v. Georgetown University Hospital

References

External links 
 

United States Supreme Court cases
United States Supreme Court cases of the Stone Court
United States administrative case law
United States securities case law
Chenery Corporation (1943)
1943 in United States case law